The Witches is a 1967 commedia all'italiana anthology film produced by Dino De Laurentiis in 1965. It consists of five comic stories, directed by Luchino Visconti, Franco Rossi, Pier Paolo Pasolini, Mauro Bolognini and Vittorio De Sica. Each story is about witches and features Silvana Mangano.

This is one of De Laurentiis' more eclectic films. Clint Eastwood also makes an appearance in the final story. It was the last film starring Totò to be released in his lifetime.

Segments

"The Witch Burned Alive" 
A famous actress arrives in an Austrian chalet to spend an evening with friends. The woman is gotten drunk by the guests, and when she falls unconscious, friends remove her makeup to look at the imperfections of her face, always believed beautiful by her fans.

"Civic Spirit" 
A man is wounded in a traffic accident. A woman stops the car and offers to take him to the hospital. The woman, however, only does this to pass the road traffic. When she arrives at her destination, she throws him out.

"The Earth Seen from the Moon" 
This comic episode, directed by Pasolini, tells the story of a red-headed father and son, Ciancicato and Baciu Miao (Totò and Ninetto Davoli). Ciancicato has just lost his wife and wants to marry a new wife. Ciancicato finds a deaf girl among the shacks on the outskirts of Rome and makes her his bride. To buy a better house nearby, he concocts a plan for her to threaten to commit suicide (distraught by her sick children) by jumping from the Coliseum, and take a collection to save her, but she slips on a banana peel and falls, and is buried next to his former wife.

"The Sicilian Belle" 
In this short episode, a Sicilian woman tells her father a man made a pass at her; he retaliates by massacring the family.

"An Evening Like the Others" 
Clint Eastwood is a western movie lover who does not know how to change the flat relationship with his wife. One day the character disguises himself as a gunslinger to entertain his wife, but she is not impressed and he realizes that their relationship is broken forever. In the final scene, she imagines herself as a glamorous star, walking along in an evolving series of haute couture while being ogled by a growing crowd of middle-aged businessmen. She lastly dons a magnificent gown made of multiple layers of silk, each in a vibrant shade, which she peels away layer by layer.

Cast 

 "The Witch Burned Alive" 
 Silvana Mangano as Gloria
 Annie Girardot as Valeria
 Francisco Rabal as Paolo
 Massimo Girotti as Sportsman
 Véronique Vendell as Young Girlfriend
 Elsa Albani as Gossip
 Clara Calamai as Ex-Actress
 Marilù Tolo as Waitress
 Nora Ricci as Gloria's Secretary
 Dino Mele as Dino, the Waiter
 Helmut Berger (as Helmut Steinbergher) as Hotel Page
 Bruno Filippini as Singer
 Leslie French as Industrialist

 "Civic Spirit"
 Silvana Mangano as Woman in a Hurry
 Alberto Sordi as Elio Ferocci

 "The Earth Seen from the Moon" 
 Silvana Mangano as Assurdina Caì
 Totò as Ciancicato Miao
 Ninetto Davoli (as Nenetto Davoli) as Baciu Miao
 Laura Betti as Male Tourist
 Luigi Leoni as Female Tourist
 Mario Cipriani as Priest 

 "The Sicilian Belle" 
 Silvana Mangano as Nunzia
 Pietro Tordi as Nunzia's Father 

 "An Evening Like the Others" 
 Silvana Mangano as Giovanna
 Clint Eastwood as Carlo 
 Valentino Macchi as Man at Stadium
 Corinne Fontaine as Admirer
 Armando Bottin as Nembo Kid
 Gianni Gori as Diabolik
 Paolo Gozlino as Mandrake the Magician
 Franco Moruzzi as Sadik
 Angelo Santi as Flash Gordon
 Pietro Torrisi as Batman

Crew 

 "The Witch Burned Alive"

 "Civic Spirit" 

 "The Earth Seen from the Moon" 

 "The Sicilian Belle" 

 "An Evening Like the Others" 

 Other crew

Release 
Le streghe was never released outside of Europe as United Artists bought the film when Clint Eastwood's career began to ascend. United Artists decided not to release it in theaters but instead kept it in its library vault to prevent its viewing.

References

Bibliography

External links 
Card + Videoclip "Le streghe" 1967

1965 films
1960s Italian-language films
Films directed by Franco Rossi
Films directed by Pier Paolo Pasolini
Films directed by Luchino Visconti
Films directed by Vittorio De Sica
Italian anthology films
Commedia all'italiana
Films directed by Mauro Bolognini
Films set in Austria
Films set in the Alps
Films set in Rome
Films set in Sicily
1967 comedy films
1967 films
Films scored by Ennio Morricone
Films with screenplays by Age & Scarpelli
Films with screenplays by Cesare Zavattini
Films about witchcraft
Films scored by Piero Piccioni
1965 comedy films
1960s Italian films